The 1978 Virginia Slims of Kansas  was a women's tennis tournament played on indoor carpet courts at the Municipal Auditorium  in Kansas City, Missouri in the United States that was part of the 1978 Virginia Slims World Championship Series. It was the first edition of the tournament and was held from February 27 through March 5, 1978. First-seeded Martina Navratilova won the singles title and earned $20,000 first-prize money.

Finals

Singles
 Martina Navratilova defeated  Billie Jean King 7–5, 2–6, 6–3
 It was Navratilova's 7th singles title of the year and the 20th of her career.

Doubles
 Billie Jean King /  Martina Navratilova defeated  Kerry Melville /  Wendy Turnbull 6–4, 6–4

Prize money

References

External links
 ITF tournament edition details

Virginia Slims of Kansas
Virginia Slims of Kansas
Virginia Slims of Kansas
Virginia Slims of Kansas
Virginia Slims of Kansas
Virginia Slims of Kansas